The Light Car Company was a British manufacturer of automobiles.

Company history
Gordon Murray and Chris Craft founded the Light Car Company in St Neots in 1991 and started producing automobiles. Production ran until 1998.

Vehicles
The only model was the Rocket. The vehicle was built to be extremely lightweight and as such it weighs only 850 pounds (385.6 kg), less than the Lotus Seven or Caterham 7. The open, doorless body offers space for two people in a tandem configuration. A frame formed the chassis. A 1,000 cc Yamaha engine with options of 143 hp or 165 hp powered the vehicle. The top speed was 230 km/h (142.9 mph) for the lesser powered model. The Rocket has a wheelbase of 2413 mm, total dimensions are 3518 mm long, 1600 mm wide and 914 mm high.

Rocket R & D Limited released a new edition of the vehicle in 2007.

References
 George Nick Georgano (Chief Editor): The Beaulieu Encyclopedia of the Automobile. Volume 2: G–O. Fitzroy Dearborn Publishers, Chicago 2001, .

External links 

 www.Ultimatecarpage.com (English, accessed 12. January 2014)

References 

Defunct motor vehicle manufacturers of England
Vehicle manufacturing companies established in 1991
Defunct companies based in Cambridgeshire
Sports car manufacturers
1991 establishments in England
Vehicle manufacturing companies disestablished in 1998
1998 disestablishments in England